Nicolae Mihai (born 1926, date of death unknown) was a Romanian footballer who played as a defender.

International career
Nicolae Mihai played three friendly matches for Romania, making his debut on 18 September 1955 under coach Gheorghe Popescu I in a 3–2 loss against East Germany. His following two games were a 1–0 victory against Belgium and a 2–0 loss against Bulgaria.

References

External links
 

1926 births
Year of death missing
Romanian footballers
Romania international footballers
Place of birth missing
Association football defenders
Liga I players
Unirea Tricolor București players